Silver Haze is a 2023 British-Dutch co-production drama film, written and directed by Sacha Polak and starring Vicky Knight, Esmé Creed-Miles, Charlotte Knight, Archie Brigden and Angela Bruce. The film follows 23-year-old Franky, a nurse who, obsessed with a thirst for revenge and a need to assign guilt for a traumatic event that happened 15 years before, is unable to build any meaningful relationship until she falls in love with one of her patients – Florence.

It is nominated to compete for the Panorama Audience Award at the 73rd Berlin International Film Festival, where it had its world premiere on February 19, 2023. The film was also nominated for Best Feature Film Teddy Award, but it won Teddy Award Jury prize.

Cast
 Vicky Knight as Franky
 Esmé Creed-Miles as Florence
 Charlotte Knight as Leah
 Archie Brigden as Jack
 Angela Bruce as Alice
 Alfie Deegan
 Sandra Kwiek
 Brandon Bendell
 Carrie Bunyan
 Sarah-Jane Dent
 Cain Aiden

Production 
Sacha Polak participated in the Les Arcs work-in-progress selection in 2021, it was among 15 projects selected for work in progress section out of 164 participants. There the film won a special jury mention in the work-in-progress section.

Vicky Knight was selected as the main lead, the film is partly inspired by Knight's own experiences, when she was eight one third of her body was burnt in a fire. The film is produced by the Viking Film from Netherlands and Emu Films from United Kingdom. It was shot in 2021 in Dagenham and Southend in the United Kingdom. It completed post-production in 2022.

Release

Silver Haze had its premiere on February 19, 2023, as part of the 73rd Berlin International Film Festival, in Panorama.

It was reported on 9 December 2022, that Poland-based sales agent New Europe Film Sales has acquired the worldwide rights. They have already sold the film to The Jokers for distribution in France and Cineart in Benelux.

Reception

Wendy Ide for ScreenDaily wrote in review that "the snapshots of various elements of Franky’s [protagonist] life are intensely felt and authentic, but they are not always cohesive, and a rather diffident and wafty score fails to tie the disparate elements together." Concluding Ide praised Vicky Knight stating, "Knight is a compelling and fiercely persuasive performer."

Accolades

References

External links
 
 
 Silver Haze at Berlinale

2023 films
2023 drama films
2023 LGBT-related films
2020s English-language films
2020s British films
LGBT-related drama films
British LGBT-related films
Dutch LGBT-related films
Dutch drama films